Nicolò Jarod Bulega (born 16 October 1999) is an Italian motorcycle racer, set to compete in the 2022 Supersport World Championship with Aruba.it Racing Ducati Team. He has also been a competitor in the CEV Moto3 Championship in 2014 and 2015, becoming Moto3 Junior World Champion in 2015. Prior to competing in the CEV, Bulega won the Italian and European MiniGP 50 championships, and was Italian champion in the PreGP 125 and PreGP 250 classes.

He is the son of former Grand Prix motorcycle racer, Davide Bulega.

Career

Early career
Born in Montecchio Emilia, Bulega started his career aged 8 in the Italian Minimoto Championship. In 2010 he made his debut in MiniGP 50, in both the Italian and European championships, winning both in 2011. In 2012 he won the Italian Championship 125 PreGP and the following year he won the Italian Championship Pre GP 250. As a result, he moved into the CEV Moto3 Championship for the 2014 season, he finished 6th overall in his rookie season with two podium finishes.

He also won the 2015 FIM CEV Moto3 Junior World Championship.

Moto3 World Championship

Sky Racing Team VR46 (2015–2018)

2015
In 2015, Bulega made his Grand Prix debut with Sky Racing Team VR46 riding a KTM in the Valencian Grand Prix, and finished the race in twelfth place, scoring four points.

2016
In 2016, Bulega started competing full-time in the Moto3 World Championship with Sky Racing Team by VR46. He started the 2016 season with a sixth place at Qatar. At his fifth race in Moto3, Bulega achieved his first Grand Prix podium at Jerez with 2nd-place finish having started from pole position, which was his first pole position in Grand Prix racing. Bulega's first fastest lap came at the British Grand Prix in the last lap. Followed by a crash in Aragon, on his birthday Bulega finished the Japanese grand Prix at fourth place, and again set the fastest lap. However, after the third place holder Hiroki Ono was disqualified, Bulega was awarded third place. Both in Australia and Malaysia, Bulega crashed in the opening lap. Despite qualifying 4th, Bulega started the final race at Valencia in 16th place due to a 12 place grid penalty, and finished the race at 17th, thus losing the 'Rookie of the year' title to Joan Mir. Bulega finished the championship in 7th place with 129 points.

2017
In a year where former Rookie of the Year rival Joan Mir won the 2017 Moto3 World Championship, Bulega struggled to replicate his debut season. His difficulties included bad qualifying strategies and bad starts (mainly due to his height), and his best results of the year were a 4th place on Germany, one of the few times he was able to qualify on the top 6, and two 5th places, in his "home" race in Rimini, and in the USA. He finished the disappointing season in 12th place, with 81 points.

2018
Bulega's 2018 season was even worse than 2017. He retired in the first four races, and finished the fifth race, only 17th in Spain, being one of the two regular drivers to not score points in the first five races of the year. His only top 10 finish came in Thailand, where he finished 7th. He ended the season with mere 18 points, and 26th in the standings.

Moto2 World Championship

Sky Racing Team VR46 (2019)

2019
For the 2019 Moto2 World Championship, despite his poor results, and mainly due to his height and weight on smaller bikes, Bulega was given an opportunity in Moto2 by Sky Racing Team VR46, partnering Luca Marini. He performed somewhat better, with 4 top-10 finishes in the Spanish, French, Czech, and Thai Grand Prixs, but finished 17th in the standings with 48 points. Marini ended in 6th, with 190 points, and 4 podiums (two victories), and Sky VR46 decided not to keep Bulega for a second season.

Federal Oil Gresini Moto2 (2020–2021)

2020
In the 2020 Moto2 World Championship, Bulega was partnered by Edgar Pons at Gresini. Bulega once again had a bad year, only finishing in the top 10 twice, ending the season 20th in the standings, with 32 points. Luckily for him, Pons had an even worse season, finishing with points in just two races.

2021
For the 2021 season, Bulega's teammate was Fabio Di Giannantonio. Di Giannantonio finished on the podium three times, winning a race in Jerez, while Bulega only finished in a point scoring position three times throughout the season. His 12 points of the season were Bulega's lowest ever of a full season in his career, and due to his bad performance, Gresini elected not to keep him for the 2022 season.

Supersport World Championship
On September 22, 2021, it was announced that Bulega would join Aruba.it Racing for their first season of the 2022 Supersport World Championship.

Career statistics

FIM CEV Moto3 Junior World Championship

Races by year
(key) (Races in bold indicate pole position, races in italics indicate fastest lap)

Grand Prix motorcycle racing

By season

By class

Races by year
(key) (Races in bold indicate pole position, races in italics indicate fastest lap)

Supersport World Championship

Races by year
(key) (Races in bold indicate pole position; races in italics indicate fastest lap)

 Season still in progress.

References

External links

 
 

1999 births
Living people
Italian motorcycle racers
Moto3 World Championship riders
Sportspeople from Reggio Emilia
Moto2 World Championship riders
Supersport World Championship riders